Lucien Koch (born 2 January 1996) is a Swiss snowboarder. He participated at the 2014 Winter Olympics in Sochi.

References

1996 births
Snowboarders at the 2014 Winter Olympics
Living people
Olympic snowboarders of Switzerland
Swiss male snowboarders
21st-century Swiss people